Nordhavn may refer to:

Nordhavnen, harbour in Copenhagen, Denmark
Nordhavn Station, train station in Copenhagen
 Nordhavn (yacht)